Slavery in Korea formally existed from antiquity up to the 20th century. Slavery was very important in medieval Korea; it was a major institution. The importance of slavery in Korea fluctuated over time. The Korean "nobi" system of slavery peaked between the 15th and 17th centuries and then declined in the 18th and 19th centuries. Some scholars view the Korean system of slavery as serfdom; the nature of Korean slavery is a source of debate. Korea had the longest unbroken chain of slavery of any society in history, spanning about 1,500 years, because of a long history of peaceful transitions and stable societies. The slave population declined to 1.5% by 1858. Slavery was legally abolished in 1895 but existed until 1930.

Today, the practice of slavery in South Korea is illegal, though surreptitious forms of illicit modern slavery such as human trafficking still exist. In North Korea, slavery is still practiced by the country's regime. According to the Global Slavery Index, an estimated 10.4% of the North Korean population is effectively enslaved as of 2018.

History

Slavery in Korea existed since before the Three Kingdoms of Korea period, approximately 2,000 years ago. Slavery has been described as "very important in medieval Korea, probably more important than in any other East Asian country, but by the 16th century, population growth was making [it] unnecessary". According to Korean Studies scholar Mark A. Peterson of Brigham Young University, Korea has the longest unbroken chain of slavery of any society in history (spanning about 1,500 years), which he attributes to a long history of peaceful transitions and stable societies in Korea. Peterson cites this as "[a] proof that Korean history has been remarkably peaceful and stable until the 20th century".

Slavery fully developed during the Three Kingdoms of Korea period. The institution of slavery likely weakened when Silla unified the Korean Peninsula. Slaves were freed on a large scale in 956 by the Goryeo dynasty. Gwangjong of Goryeo proclaimed the Slave and Land Act, an act that "deprived nobles of much of their manpower in the form of slaves and purged the old nobility, the meritorious subjects and their offspring and military lineages in great numbers". Information about slavery in the middle Goryeo period is nonexistent. Slavery intensified and many slave rebellions occurred at the end of the Goryeo dynasty. Slaves were freed on a large scale at the beginning of the Joseon dynasty.

In the Joseon period, members of the slave class were known as nobi. The nobi were socially indistinct from freemen (i.e., the middle and common classes) other than the ruling yangban class, and some possessed property rights, legal entities and civil rights. Hence, some scholars argue that it is inappropriate to call them "slaves", while some scholars describe them as serfs. The Korean word for a slave in the Western sense is noye, not nobi. Some nobi owned their own nobi. According to Bok Rae Kim: "In summary, on the economic, judicial and socio-cultural levels, it is evident that the nobis of the [Joseon] era were not 'socially dead' and that the nobi system at its zenith between the fifteenth and seventeenth centuries may be defined as 'a serfdom developed under slavery'."

Household nobi served as personal retainers and domestic servants, and most received a monthly salary that could be supplemented by earnings gained outside regular working hours. Out-resident nobi resided at a distance and were little different from tenant farmers or commoners. They were registered officially as independent family units and possessed their own houses, families, land, and fortunes. Out-resident nobi were far more numerous than household nobi. In the chakkae system, nobi were assigned two pieces of agricultural land, with the resulting produce from the first land paid to the master, and the produce from the second land kept by the nobi to consume or sell. In order to gain freedom, nobi could purchase it, earn it through military service, or receive it as a favor from the government. The nobi population could fluctuate up to about one-third of the population, but on average the nobi made up about 10% of the total population.

The hierarchical relationship between yangban master and nobi was believed to be equivalent to the Confucian hierarchical relationship between ruler and subject, or father and son. Nobi were considered an extension of the master's own body, and an ideology based on patronage and mutual obligation developed. The Annals of King Taejong stated: "The nobi is also a human being like us; therefore, it is reasonable to treat him generously" and "In our country, we love our nobis like a part of our body."

In 1426, Sejong the Great enacted a law that granted government nobi women 100 days of maternity leave after childbirth, which, in 1430, was lengthened by one month before childbirth. In 1434, Sejong also granted the husbands 30 days of paternity leave.

The nobi system declined in the 18th and 19th centuries. Since the outset of the Joseon dynasty and especially beginning in the 17th century, there was harsh criticism among prominent thinkers in Korea about the nobi system. Even within the Joseon government, there were indications of a shift in attitude toward the nobi. King Yeongjo implemented a policy of gradual emancipation in 1775, and he and his successor King Jeongjo made many proposals and developments that lessened the burden on nobi, which led to the emancipation of the vast majority of government nobi in 1801. In addition, population growth, numerous escaped slaves, growing commercialization of agriculture, and the rise of the independent small farmer class contributed to the decline in the number of nobi to about 1.5% of the total population by 1858. The hereditary nobi system was officially abolished around 1886 and 1887, and the rest of the nobi system was abolished with the Gabo Reform of 1894. However, slavery did not completely disappear in Korea until 1930, during Imperial Japanese rule.

During Japanese rule over Korea around World War II, some Koreans were used in forced labor by the Japanese, in conditions which have been compared to slavery. These included women forced into sexual slavery by the Imperial Japanese Army before and during World War II, known as "comfort women".

Modern slavery

North Korea

With 1,100,000 people in modern slavery (via forced labor), North Korea is ranked highest in the world in terms of the percentage of population in modern slavery, with 10.4 percent enslaved according to the Walk Free Foundation's 2018 Global Slavery Index. North Korea is the only country in the world that has not explicitly criminalized any form of modern slavery. A United Nations report listed slavery among the crimes against humanity occurring in North Korea. Revenues derived from North Korean slave labor also are diverted to fund and develop the country's nuclear weapons program.

South Korea

In media reports from 2015, the abuse and exploitation of people with disabilities on rural island salt farms in Sinan County has been described as slavery.

In terms of people in modern slavery in absolute numbers South Korea ranked 137th in the 2018 Global Slavery Index, with some 99,000 people estimated to be enslaved.

See also 
History of slavery in Asia
Slavery in Japan

References

Further reading
, PhD dissertation
, A.B. Thesis

 
 Vinton, C. C. "Slavery and Feudalism in Korea," Korean Repository, II (1895), pp. 366–372

External links